The 2022 Baseball5 World Cup was the first edition of the Baseball5 World Cup, the mixed-gender Baseball5 (B5) world championship organized by the World Baseball Softball Confederation (WBSC). It was held in Mexico City from 7 to 12 November 2022. Twelve teams took part. 

Cuba won the tournament, beating Japan in the final 2 matches to 0. Chinese Taipei finished third defeating Venezuela 2 matches to 0 in the Bronze medal game.

Qualification

1There was no qualification event for WBSC Americas and WBSC Oceania. Teams were selected by World Baseball Softball Confederation.

2In October 2022, WBSC chose Hong Kong to replace Australia.

Venues

Opening round

Group A

Group B

Second round

Super round

Placement round

Final standings

Awards

References

External links
Official website

Baseball5 World Cup
Baseball5 World Cup
Baseball5 World Cup
Baseball5 World Cup
International sports competitions hosted by Mexico
Baseball5 World Cup